Dondo may refer to:

 Dondo, Mozambique, a city in Mozambique
 Dondo District, a district in Mozambique
 Dondo, Angola, a town and commune in Angola
 Dondo, Sulawesi, a district in Tolitoli Regency, Sulawesi, Indonesia
 Dondo Dam, Miki, Hyōgo Prefecture, Japan
 Léon Kengo Wa Dondo (born 1935), politician from Zaïre
 Dondo language (Austronesian), a language of Sulawesi in Indonesia
  Dondo, a talking drum in the Akan languages
 Dondo, the second album by Bice Osei Kuffour, (born 1981), a Ghanaian hiplife musician
 Dondo, people in Congo.

See also

Donyo